Arianna Farfaletti Casali (born 22 June 1976) is a former Italian-born Swiss female pole vaulter.

Biography
She won three national championships at senior level, her personal best 4.42 m, set in Busto Arsizio 2008, that was national record, is still the 4th best Italian performance of all-time (3rd outdoor). In 2008 her measure was also the 42nd world best performance of the year in the IAAF season's lists.

National records
 Pole vault: 4.42 m ( Busto Arsizio, 21 September 2008) - holder till 17 May 2009 (broken by Anna Giordano Bruno)

National titles
Italian Athletics Championships
Pole vault: 2000, 2003, 2006

See also
Italian all-time lists - Pole vault

References

External links
 }

1976 births
Living people
Italian female pole vaulters